Forest Township may refer to:

 Forest Township, Clinton County, Indiana
 Forest Township, Winnebago County, Iowa
 Forest Township, Cheboygan County, Michigan 
 Forest Township, Genesee County, Michigan
 Forest Township, Missaukee County, Michigan 
 Forest Township, Becker County, Minnesota 
 Forest Township, Rice County, Minnesota 
 Forest Township, Holt County, Missouri

Township name disambiguation pages